Michael Uzowuru  (born November 10, 1991) is an American record producer. He has produced and written for SZA, Frank Ocean, Beyoncé, Donald Glover, Vince Staples, Earl Sweatshirt, and Rosalía, among others.

Life and career
Michael Uzowuru was born on November 10, 1991, in Los Angeles and raised in both Cypress, California and Rancho Cucamonga, California. He is of Igbo descent.

2010–2015: Career beginnings 
Uzowuru began his music career by making independent beat tapes and working with a number of collaborators. His early projects include works with Vince Staples and Odd Future's Domo Genesis, Matt Martians from the Jet Age of Tomorrow, and Hodgy Beats.

In early 2012, Uzowuru released a mixtape entitled Winter in Prague with longtime friend and collaborator Vince Staples. The mixtape received positive reviews from critics and fans. In 2013, Uzowuru produced the opening track "Pre" for Earl Sweatshirt's debut album Doris. Later that year, he produced "Tweakin" and "Yap Yap" for Chicago rapper Vic Mensa's second mixtape Innanetape.

In addition to producing for other artists, he has released a number of instrumental and solo projects. Notably Paisley Palm Trees, which was premiered by The Fader magazine and Pink Orchids, released in August 2014. A departure from his usual beat production, the project is composed of cinematic instrumentals with a feature from Vic Mensa on the track "Waves".

2016–present 
Uzowuru's name appeared on the production credits for Frank Ocean's 2016 visual album Endless and Ocean's long-awaited second studio album Blonde. Uzowuru is credited as both a writer and a producer on the track "Nights". He also executive produced rapper Kevin Abstract's second album American Boyfriend, which debuted in the Fall of 2016.

In 2017, he appeared as co-producer on Frank Ocean's single "Chanel", released on Ocean's Beats1 radio show. Scott Vener and Pharrell Williams premiered a remix done by Uzowuru and collaborator Jeff Kleinman of Little Dragon's "High" featuring Denzel Curry and Twelve'len

In 2018, Uzowuru's work appeared on Anderson .Paak's "Til It's Over", which was used in Apple's "Welcome Home" commercial directed by Spike Jonze. Following "Welcome Home", he produced and wrote an additional song for Apple's iPad Pro commercial of the same year.

In spring 2019, Uzowuru composed the score for the short film Guava Island, starring and produced by Donald Glover, which was released by Amazon Studios. That following summer, Uzowuru was credited for writing and production on Beyoncé's compilation album The Lion King: The Gift, having worked on the tracks "Mood 4 Eva" and "Brown Skin Girl".

Continuing with his production and writing work, Uzowuru appears on credits for artists like FKA Twigs and GoldLink. In Fall of 2019, Uzowuru appeared on the production and writing credits of Frank Ocean's "In My Room". In 2020 he began working on the Motomami album by Spanish songstress Rosalía. At the Latin Grammy Awards of 2022, Uzuwuru as a writer/producer of eight songs on the album won Album of the Year.

Discography

Music for Film

Writing & Production Credits

Mixtapes & EPs

Singles

References 

25 New Producers To Watch Out For
The FADER - Michael Uzowuru
Download Vince Staples and Michael Uzowuru’s Winter In Prague Mixtape

American hip hop musicians
1991 births
Living people
American people of Igbo descent